Marsala is an Italian city on the island of Sicily.

Marsala can also refer to:

Marsala Ship, a warship wreck in the harbor of Sicily
Marsala wine
Chicken marsala, an Italian-American dish made with the wine
Marsala, fictional character in the animated series Exosquad
Marsala (surname)
S.S.D. Marsala Calcio, an Italian football club

See also
Masala (disambiguation)